The 2017–18 season was Newcastle United's first season back in the Premier League following their promotion from the EFL Championship last season. It was their 23rd year in the Premier League since it was formed at the start of the 1992-93 Season, and it was their 86th season overall in the top division of English football. This season Newcastle United participated in the Premier League, EFL Cup and FA Cup. The season covered the period from 1 July 2017 to 30 June 2018.

Club

Coaching staff

The Newcastle United first team coaching staff for the 2017–18 season consists of the following:

First Team

Squads

First team squad

Transfers and loans

Transfers in

 Total spending:  £44,900,000

Transfers out

 Total incoming:  ~ £21,000,000

Loans in

Loans out

Pre-season and friendlies
As of 28 June 2017, Newcastle United have announced six pre-season friendlies against Heart of Midlothian, Preston North End, Bradford City, FSV Mainz, VfL Wolfsburg and Hellas Verona.

On 12 March 2018, Newcastle United announced they would be playing Belgian side Royal Antwerp on 18 March 2018 at the Pinatar Arena in Murcia, Spain.

Competitions

Overall summary

Overview

Cards
Accounts for all competitions. Last updated on 5 May 2018.

Goals
Last updated on 13 May 2018.

Clean sheets
Last updated on 13 May 2018.

References

Newcastle United F.C. seasons
Newcastle United